The Danish Open was the national open golf tournament of Denmark. In 1991, from 1993–1997 and from 2000–2004 it was an event on the Challenge Tour.

Winners

Notes

See also
Danish PGA Championship

References

External links
Coverage on the Challenge Tour's official site

Former Challenge Tour events
Golf tournaments in Denmark